José Delaval (born 27 March 1921, date of death unknown) was a Belgian field hockey player. He competed at the 1948 Summer Olympics and the 1952 Summer Olympics.

References

External links
 

1921 births
Year of death missing
Belgian male field hockey players
Olympic field hockey players of Belgium
Field hockey players at the 1948 Summer Olympics
Field hockey players at the 1952 Summer Olympics
Field hockey players from Brussels